The 1931 Liverpool East Toxteth by-election was held on 5 February 1931.  The by-election was held due to the succession to the peerage of the incumbent Conservative MP, Henry Mond.  It was won by the Conservative candidate Patrick Buchan-Hepburn. Mond, a former Liberal had won the seat for the Conservatives at a by-election in 1929 and had held it with an increased at the 1929 general election a few weeks later. Buchan-Hepburn had previously served on the London County Council and as a private secretary to Winston Churchill.

Result

Aftermath
At the general election later in the year Patrick Buchan-Hepburn scored an even greater victory, defeating a Liberal by over 19,000 votes. On that occasion, Labour did not field a candidate.

References

Liverpool East Toxteth by-election
Liverpool East Toxteth by-election
1930s in Liverpool
East Toxteth, 1931
Liverpool East Toxteth by-election